William Dickinson Martin (October 20, 1789 – November 17, 1833) was a U.S. Representative from South Carolina.

Born in Martintown, Edgefield District, South Carolina, Martin pursued an academic course.  He studied law at Edgefield and attended the Litchfield Law School.  He was admitted to the bar in 1811 and commenced practice in Edgefield, South Carolina, the same year.

He moved to Coosawhatchie, Beaufort County, in 1813.  He served as member of the State house of representatives for St. Luke's Parish 1816–1817.  He served as clerk of the State senate 1818–1826.

Martin was elected as a Jacksonian to the Twentieth and Twenty-first Congresses (March 4, 1827 – March 3, 1831).  He served as judge of the circuit courts of law and appeal 1831–1833.

He moved to Columbia, South Carolina, where he resided until his death in Charleston, South Carolina, November 17, 1833.  He was interred in the churchyard cemetery of St. Michael's Church.

Sources

1789 births
1833 deaths
Jacksonian members of the United States House of Representatives from South Carolina
19th-century American politicians
Burials at St. Michael's Churchyard (Charleston)